A Long Time Ago is a studio album by Canadian musician Kenny Wheeler, released in 1999 on ECM.

Track listing
All compositions by Kenny Wheeler.

"The Long Time Ago Suite" - 31:56
"One Plus Three (Version 1)" - 2:20
"Ballad for a Dead Child" - 5:58
"Eight Plus Three / Alice My Dear" - 8:30
"Going for Baroque" - 3:21
"Gnu Suite" - 9:23
"One Plus Three (Version 2)" - 2:22

Personnel
Kenny Wheeler - flugelhorn
John Taylor - piano
John Parricelli - guitar
Derek Watkins, John Barclay, Henry Lowther, Ian Hamer - trumpet
Pete Beachill (2-7), Mark Nightingale, Richard Edwards (1) - trombone
Sarah Williams, Dave Stewart - bass trombone
Tony Faulkner - conductor

References

ECM Records albums
Kenny Wheeler albums
1999 albums